Delphe Kifouani is a Congolese filmmaker and writer on African cinema. He teaches cinema at the University of Saint-Louis, Senegal.

Life
Kifouani studied at Marien Ngouabi University in Brazzaville, graduating with a BA in literature and French language in 2004 and an MA in French literature in 2006.

From One Riverbank to the Other (2009) follows the daily journeys of disabled people, crossing the River Congo to travel between Brazzaville and Kinshasa. In the words of critic Olivier Barlet:

Works

Films
 Nos ambassadeurs / Our Ambassadors, 2008
 Un ami est parti / A Friend is Gone, 2008
 D'une rive à l'autre / From One Riverbank to the Other, 2009
 La peau noire de dieu / The Black Skin of God, 2016

Books
 (ed. with François Fronty) La diversité du documentaire de creation en Afrique. Editions L'Harmattan, 2015.
 De l'analogique au numérique. Cinémas et spectateurs d'Afrique subsaharienne: francophone à l'épreuve du changement. Editions L'Harmattan, 2016

References

External links
 

Living people
Marien Ngouabi University alumni
Republic of the Congo film directors
Republic of the Congo writers
Year of birth missing (living people)